Esquivando Charcos is the first album by Argentine band La Renga. Until 1991 it was only available in cassette and it was not available in music shops, although the live versions of these songs (along with a few other tracks) can be heard in the album Bailando En Una Pata. It was recorded, distributed and produced in a totally independent way by the band.

The album was included in a US-only collection called Clásicos del Rock en Español without the band's knowledge and with different artwork.

Background
Since the band did not have a company to produce the album, they decided to do it themselves (record, distribution and production). They made 1000 copies, which they sold at their concerts. With the great progress the band made, when they became famous (after releasing their fourth album Despedazado por Mil Partes), PolyGram suggested to them that it should be re-released. After some doubts, they decided that it was a good idea and in 1998 Esquivando Charcos was available in stores. The album achieved platinum status in Argentina that year.

Track listing
All songs by Gustavo Napoli. Tracks 5 and 9 are rehearsals recorded "live" (actually with overdubbed audience) in the studio itself.

 "Somos Los Mismos de Siempre" [We are the same as always] - 3:14
 "Moscas Verdes Para El Charlatán" [Green flies for the quack] - 4:11
 "Embrollos, Fatos y Paquetes" [Tricks, facts and packages] - 4:32
 "Luciendo Mi Saquito Blusero" [Wearing my blouse coat] - 3:10
 "Voy a Bailar a La Nave del Olvido" [I'm going to dance to the ship of oblivion] - 4:00
 "Buseca y Vino Tinto" [Buseca and red wine] - 3:04
 "El Juicio del Ganso" [The judgment of the goose] - 4:57
 "Negra Mi Alma, Negro Mi Corazón" [Black my soul, black my heart] - 4:05
 "Blues de Bolivia" [Bolivia blues] - 4:44

Personnel
Chizzo - lead vocals, rhythm guitar
Locura - lead guitar
Tete - bass guitar
Tanque - drums

Guest musicians
Chiflo - saxophone

Additional personnel
Alvaro Villagra - mixing

References

1991 albums
La Renga albums